Lisa Ruth Germano (born June 27, 1958) is an American singer-songwriter and multi-instrumentalist from Indiana. Her album Geek the Girl (1994) was chosen as a top album of the 1990s by Spin magazine. She began her career as a violinist for John Mellencamp. , she has released thirteen albums.

Early life
Germano was born in Mishawaka, Indiana, one of five children of violinist Rocco and Betty Germano. She studied music, including piano and violin, as a child. When she was seven, she composed a fifteen-minute opera for the piano.

Career

On the road with Mellencamp
Germano was working as a violinist when rock singer John Mellencamp invited her to play on his album. For seven years she toured and recorded as a member of Mellencamp's band, appearing on The Lonesome Jubilee (1987), Big Daddy (1989), Falling from Grace (1991), Human Wheels (1993), and Dance Naked (1994). During the 1980s she also appeared on albums by Simple Minds and the Indigo Girls.

Solo career
After recording with Henry Lee Summer, Bob Seger, and Carrie Newcomer, Germano began a solo career with the album On the Way Down from the Moon Palace (1991), recorded in Indianapolis and released by her label, Major Bill Records. Although sales were low, the album got the attention of Capitol Records, which signed her to a contract and released her next album  Happiness (1993). Personnel changes at Capitol resulted in the departure of most of her benefactors, but she retained the rights to her album.

Working for a British label
She signed a contract with the British label 4AD, which had a manufacturing and distribution deal with Warner Bros. in the U.S. Ivo Watts-Russell, founder and president of 4AD, was a fan of Germano's work. He remixed some of the tracks from Happiness with producer and engineer John Fryer, who had been involved in Watts-Russell's This Mortal Coil project. In early 1994, 4AD issued Inconsiderate Bitch, a limited-edition EP which contained five of the remixed tracks. In April of that year Happiness was reissued with different artwork, mixing, sequencing. Two tracks, including a cover version of  "These Boots Are Made for Walkin'", were replaced.

Germano's album Geek the Girl (1994) was reviewed positively by the press and was a noted album of the 1990s. Much attention  was given to the track "...A Psychopath", which contains audio from a 9-1-1 emergency phone call by a woman who was being terrorized by an intruder in her home. In 1995, Germano contributed the song "The Mirror Is Gone" to the AIDS benefit album Red Hot + Bothered produced by the Red Hot Organization.

Excerpts From a Love Circus (1996) was praised by Spin and Rolling Stone. Earlier that year, Watts-Russell approached 4AD's musicians with the idea that each act would find another person or band to collaborate with on three songs. The recordings would then be released by the label as a monthly series of EPs. Germano worked with rock band Giant Sand, but after their tracks had been recorded, the label decided that the series would be unfeasible and rejected the idea. Germano and the members of Giant Sand liked the results and enjoyed collaborating, and despite the labels' lack of interest in the recordings, recorded an album in less than a week. Managers for Germano and Giant Sand made a deal with Thirsty Ear Recordings to release the album as a one-off project under the name OP8, and the album Slush was released in February 1997. In April 1997, 4AD began promoting "I Love a Snot" (remixed by Tchad Blake) to radio and retail stores in America, but sales of the album remained static at best. "Lovesick" from Excerpts from a Love Circus was remixed by Trevor Jackson (a.k.a. The Underdog), and released by his label, Output Recordings.

Sales began to sag noticeably with the release of Slide, produced by Tchad Blake, in July 1998. The distribution deal with Warner Bros. ended, returning 4AD to independent status, and without Warner Bros. Slide received less promotion. Before the album was released she was invited to sing backup vocals on tour for The Smashing Pumpkins. Although she rejected the offer at first, singer Billy Corgan persuaded her that she would have a more collaborative role, and she agreed to join the tour. She rehearsed with the band for four weeks in Chicago. The night before the tour was supposed to begin, Corgan dismissed her (via the tour manager) with no explanation.

Intent on resuming the promotion of Slide, she went on tour, opening for the Eels and then headlining smaller clubs. While on tour she was notified by 4AD that they were dropping her from the label. By the end of 1998, she announced that she was done with the music business. She fired her management. Nonetheless, in 1999 she performed in Toronto at Lee's Palace.

Moving to Hollywood

Germano moved to Hollywood and began working at an independent bookstore. Songwriting remained part of her life, and she collaborated with Yann Tiersen, David Bowie, Neil Finn, and Joey Waronker.  In 2002 she released two compilations of songs from her back catalog. Concentrated is a selection of "greatest hits" with a few oddities, such as the Underdog remix of "Lovesick". Rare, Unusual or Just Bad Songs is composed of rarities, such as "Breathe Acrost Texas" which was omitted from the reissue of Happiness, and tracks that were previously unavailable. Each copy came with an insert painted by Germano.

Later that year, she began gathering songs she had been writing and recording mostly by herself at home during the previous two years. She sent CDs of these tracks to labels and friends in the music industry. The first to respond was a longtime acquaintance, producer and label executive Tony Berg. After the relative success of the ARTISTdirect websites, CEO Marc Geiger started Ineffable Records with Berg in 2002. Germano was the first act signed to the label's roster.

Lullaby for Liquid Pig was released in 2003 with help from guitarist Johnny Marr (of The Smiths and Modest Mouse), Neil Finn, and Wendy Melvoin. The album met with critical acclaim, but the label shut down. Three years later she was invited by Michael Gira of the band Swans to join his label, Young God Records. The label released the album In the Maybe World (2006) and reissued Lullaby for Liquid Pig (2007) with a bonus disc of unreleased live recordings and demos.

In 2012, Germano was the violinist on two national tours by Tammy Lang, the Chelsea Madchen tour in which the singer parodied Nico of Velvet Underground and her outing as a subversive country-and-western alter ego Tammy Faye Starlite. Drummer Pete Thomas played on both tours, as did guitarist Peter "Petey" Andrews. The band "played some of the best blues rock music I've heard in years," wrote Huffington Post music correspondent Wendy Block.

Discography
 On the Way Down from the Moon Palace (Major Bill, 1991)
 Happiness  (Capitol, 1993/4AD, 1994)
 Geek the Girl (4AD, 1994)
 Excerpts from a Love Circus  (4AD, 1996)
 Slush (Thirsty Ear, 1997)  (with OP8)
 Slide  (4AD, 1998)
 Lullaby for Liquid Pig  (Ineffable/ARTISTdirect, 2003)
 In the Maybe World (Young God, 2006)
 Magic Neighbor (Young God, 2009)
 No Elephants (Badman, 2013)

As guest
With David Bowie
 2002 Heathen
 2002 "Slow Burn"

With Michael Brook
 2006 RockPaperScissors 
 2007 BellCurve

With Eels
 1998 Electro-Shock Blues 
 2000 Oh What a Beautiful Morning
 2003 Shootenanny!

With Neil Finn
 1998 Try Whistling This
 2001 One Nil
 2002 7 Worlds Collide

With Howe Gelb
 1998 Hisser
 2013 Little Sand Box

With Indigo Girls
 1989 Indigo Girls
 1990 Nomads Indians Saints
 1992 Rites of Passage
 1994 Swamp Ophelia
 1997 Shaming of the Sun

With Billy Joel
 1990 The Downeaster Alexa (played violin for Billy Joel:Live at Yankee Stadium) 

With John Mellencamp
 1987 The Lonesome Jubilee
 1989 Big Daddy
 1993 Human Wheels
 1994 Dance Naked
 1998 John Mellencamp
 2010 On the Rural Route 7609

With Simple Minds
 1987 Live in the City of Light
 1989 Street Fighting Years
 1991 Real Life

With Yann Tiersen
 2001 L' Absente
 2003 C'etait Ici
 2008 C'etait Ici: Live

With others
 1987 The Sound of Music, The dB's
 1988 Rebels Without a Clue, The Bellamy Brothers
 1989 I've Got Everything, Henry Lee Summer
 1991 The Fire Inside, Bob Seger
 1991 Visions and Dreams, Carrie Newcomer
 1991 World So Bright, Adam Schmitt
 1992 Candyland, James McMurtry
 1993 American Caesar, Iggy Pop
 1993 Strays, Junkhouse
 1995 Glum, Giant Sand
 1996 Caledonia, John P. Strohm
 1996 Dead Spy Report, Craig Ross
 1996 In Flight, Linda Perry
 1997 Eli's Comin', Time and Love: The Music of Laura Nyro
 1998 Dopamine, Mitchell Froom
 1998 The Globe Sessions, Sheryl Crow
 2001 Las Vegas Is Cursed, Hector Zazou
 2002 Anna, Anna Waronker
 2003 0304, Jewel
 2003 From Every Sphere, Ed Harcourt
 2003 The Official Fiction, Something for Kate
 2003 True Reflections, Boyd Tinsley
 2004 Impossible Dream, Patty Griffin
 2005 The Roads Don't Love You, Gemma Hayes
 2009 Amor Vincit Omnia, Draco Rosa
 2009 Devil's Halo, Meshell Ndegeocello
 2009 Goodnight Unknown, Lou Barlow
 2009 The Sun Came Out, 7 Worlds Collide
 2010 Intriguer, Crowded House

References

External links

1958 births
Living people
People from Mishawaka, Indiana
Singers from Indiana
American folk rock musicians
American people of Italian descent
American rock violinists
Women rock singers
Dream pop musicians
Eels (band) members
4AD artists
Young God Records artists
21st-century American women singers
21st-century American singers
21st-century American violinists